The National Driving Teacher School was a vocational school which trained teachers for driver's education. The school was established in 1970 by the Ministry of Church Affairs and Education and was originally situated in Oslo. It moved to Stjørdal in 1973. From 1 January 2004 it became a division and campus of Nord-Trøndelag University College. From 1988 the school used the circuit Lånkebanen.

References

Schools in Norway
Education in Oslo
Education in Trøndelag
Stjørdal
Nord-Trøndelag University College
Road transport in Norway
1970 establishments in Norway
Driver's education